Donnchadh is a masculine given name common to the Irish and Scottish Gaelic languages. It is composed of the elements donn, meaning "brown" or "dark" from  Donn a Gaelic God; and chadh, meaning "chief" or "noble". The name is also written as Donnchad, Donncha, Donnacha, Donnchadha and Dúnchad. Modern versions include (in Ireland) Donnacha, Donagh, Donough, Donogh and (in Scotland) Duncan.

The Irish surnames Donough, McDonagh, McDonough, O'Donoghue and Dunphy among others are derived from the given name (In Gaelic: Mac - son of, Ó - of the family of). Another derivation is the name of the Scottish Clan Donnachaidh.

Variations

People
 In modern times people with the name include;
Donogh O'Malley (1921–1968) Irish Government minister
 Donncha O'Callaghan (born 1979) current international rugby player (Munster, Ireland and 2005 British and Irish lions)
Donnchadh Ó Corráin (1942–2017) Irish historian 
Donnchadh Walsh (born 1984), Irish Gaelic footballer
Donnchadh Ó Laoghaire (born 1989), Irish Sinn Féin politician and TD for Cork South–Central

Historically, it can refer to the following:

 Kings in Ireland
 Donnchad Donn (Donnchad mac Flainn) - High King 918 - 942
 Donnchad mac Briain - self-styled High King 1024 - 1026 (with opposition) - son of Brian Boru
 Donnchad Midi of Clann Cholmáin, King of Mide (died 797)
 Donnchad mac Domnall Claen of the Uí Dúnlainge, King of Leinster (deposed 1003)
 Donnchad mac Cellacháin (died 963), King of Cashel (or Munster)
 Kings of Alba or Scotland
 Donnchad mac Crínáin (also Donnchad ua Maíl Coluim) (ruled 1034–1040)
 Donnchad mac Maíl Coluim (born 1065x1069, killed 1094)
 Kings of Dál Riata (ancient Gaelic kingdom in western Scotland and north east Ireland)
 Dúnchad mac Conaing (or Dúnchad mac Dúbain) (died c. 654)
 Dúnchad Bec (died 721)
 Mormaers in Scotland
 Donnchadh, Earl of Carrick
 Donnchad I, Earl of Fife
 Donnchad II, Earl of Fife
 Donnchadh III, Earl of Fife
 Donnchadh IV, Earl of Fife
 Donnchadh, Earl of Lennox
 Donnchadh, Earl of Mar
 Donnchadh of Argyll
 Other people
 Dunchad I of Iona, Abbot of Iona, Inner Hebrides
 Donnchadh Ó Briain, Irish politician (1897–1961)
 Donnchad Baccach Ó Maolconaire (died 1404), poet and historian
 Duncan Ban MacIntyre (Donnchadh Bàn Mac an t-Saoir), Scottish poet (1724–1812_)
 Donnchadh Ó Corráin, Irish historian
 Donnchadh MacRath, Scottish poet
 Donnchadh de Strathearn, bishop of Dunkeld, Scotland

See also
 Duncan
 List of Irish-language given names

References